The 2018 Asian Para Games (Asian Para Games 2018), officially known as the 3rd Asian Para Games and also known as Indonesia 2018, was a pan-Asian multi-sport event that held from 6 to 13 October 2018 in Indonesia's capital city of Jakarta. The event paralleled the 2018 Asian Games and was held for Asian athletes with disability.

It was the first time Indonesia hosted the games. Events were held in the host city Jakarta and in Bogor Regency of West Java province. The opening ceremony was held at Gelora Bung Karno Main Stadium, while the closing ceremony was held at Gelora Bung Karno Madya Stadium next door. The games saw the debut of Bhutan as a participating nation and the introduction of chess to the Asian Para Games' program, with the removal of rowing, sailing, 5 and 7-a-side football, wheelchair dancesport and wheelchair rugby.

China led the medal tally for the third consecutive time. North Korea and South Korea march under the Korean Unification Flag at the opening ceremony and for the first time competed as a unified team in some events. They also won their first medals, one silver and one bronze medal as a unified team. In addition, Philippines and Kuwait won their first ever Asian Para Games gold medals, while Laos and East Timor won their first ever Asian Para Games medals including their first gold medals. There were 16 world, 63 Asian and 246 Asian Para Games records broken during the Games.

Host city 
As is the tradition of the event, since 2010, the Asian Para Games are usually held after every Asian Games in the same host country. On 29 February 2016, Indonesia signed the 2018 Asian Para Games host city contract at a ceremony in Jakarta, having confirmed as host city of the event on 21 October 2014 in Incheon, South Korea. A local organising committee named the Indonesia Asian Para Games Organizing Committee (INAPGOC) led by Raja Sapta Oktohari was formed soon after it was appointed host country of the 2018 Asian Para Games for all preparations, opening, organising, and finalizing the implementation of the event.

Development and preparations

Volunteers 
Volunteer recruitment was held from 21 April until 31 July 2018 with a target of 8,000 volunteers.

Torch relay 
Like the torch relay of the 2018 Asian Games, the torch relay began at the Mrapen in Central Java on 5 September 2018 where the torch was lit using the Indonesian natural eternal flame to mark the 30-day countdown to the event. The flame was passed to another 8 Indonesian cities.
Below is the schedule of the relay:
 Solo (Surakarta), Central Java (5 September)
 Ternate, North Maluku (9 September)
 Makassar, South Sulawesi (12 September)
 Denpasar, Bali (16 September)
 Pontianak, West Kalimantan (19 September)
 Medan, North Sumatera (23 September)
 Pangkal Pinang, Bangka Belitung Islands (26 September)
 Jakarta (Host city, 30 September)

A day before the torch relay, the games' torch was introduced, in which its design is inspired by Batik parang motif.

Marketing

Emblem
The emblem of the games was Harmony - Energy of Asia, modelled upon the circular roof of the Gelora Bung Karno Stadium, the main venue of the games. It represented harmony and balance within the natural environment and the people of the Asian community. The moving man in the center of the circle symbolize the movement and energy of the 2018 Asian Para Games participating athletes in achieving victory, while the 3 curves surrounding the man's silhouette represents unity in diversity among Asian countries for mutual achievement. 5 different colours are used in the logo to represent the basic elements in Asian philosophy of Living and togetherness. Blue symbolized the sky, orange symbolized the sun, green symbolized the nature, purple symbolized proximity, wisdom, loyalty, and pride and red symbolized the spirit of solidarity.

Mascot

The official mascot of the Games is a Bondol eagle named Momo whose name is short for motivation and mobility. Momo represents the icon of the capital city of Jakarta and also represents spirit. Momo wears a Betawinese Belt with Sarong.

Medals
On 5 October 2018, Indonesia Asian Para Games Organizing Committee (INAPGOC) released the medal design to the public which is inspired by the Rio 2016 Summer Paralympics medal, featuring the Asian Para Games logo on the obverse and the braille letters on the reverse. Each medal contains differing numbers of metal balls to allow the visually impaired to audibly distinguish their colour by shaking them.

Merchandising

Merchandises including the mascot plush toy were sold at the Gelora Bung Karno Main stadium area including the super store during the games.

Music
Six songs were released to promote the games, including the official theme song "Song of Victory", which was used as the background music for the games' broadcast title sequence. Two songs were not specifically composed for the games, like "Sang Juara" by Naura and Zizi, which is a version of the former's 2017 song "Juara" and a short version of 2016-released song "Manusia Kuat" by Tulus.

Venues 

The 2018 Asian Para Games uses most venues that are used to host the 2018 Asian Games events. They are located in Jakarta and neighbouring West Java province.

Gelora Bung Karno Sports Complex

Central Jakarta

East Jakarta

North Jakarta

South Jakarta

Jakarta Suburb (West Java)

The games uses the same Athletes' Village as the 2018 Asian Games which was built in Kemayoran.

Transport 

Like during the 2018 Asian Games, TransJakarta provides free bus rides involving 300 disabled-friendly buses which consists of 200 low-entry buses and 100 high-entry buses during the games for disabled athletes everyday and on weekend days during the games for the locals to encourage people to watch the games.

The Games

Opening ceremony 

The opening ceremony of the 2018 Asian Para Games took place on Saturday, 6 October 2018, at the Gelora Bung Karno Main Stadium in Jakarta, Indonesia. The event commenced at 19:00 Indonesia Western Time (UTC+7) and ended at 21:43 local time. Jay Subiyakto was the Associate creative director of the ceremony. North and South Korea delegates marched together under one unified flag of Korea for the first time.

The games was officially opened by the President of Indonesia, Joko Widodo.

Sports

The Games featured 18 sports which were split into 506 events, including chess which was included for the first time in the games' programme.

  
  
 
 
 
  
 
 Road
 Track 
 
 
 
 
 
 
 
 
 
 
 

In addition, there were 16 non-medal events contested at the games, 6 in Athletics and 10 in Swimming.

Participating National Paralympic Committees 

43 members of the Asian Paralympic Committee participated at the Games. In addition, the two Koreas competed as one joint team in selected events, the first time doing so in any para sport event which makes it the 44th participant of the games. Both nations also marched together under one flag during the opening and closing ceremonies. Bhutan and Yemen participated for the first time.

Below is a list of all the participating NPCs. The number of competitors per delegation is indicated in brackets.

Number of athletes by National Paralympic Committees (by highest to lowest)

* Including athletes represented . Unlike Asian Games, athletes of unified Korean team at the games also competed under respective national team in individual events.

Calendar 
All times are in Western Indonesia Time (UTC+7)

Closing ceremony 

The 2018 Asian Para Games closing ceremony was held on Saturday, 13 October 2018 at the Gelora Bung Karno Madya Stadium in Jakarta. In addition to local artists and a Hangzhou Asian Para Games promotional video segment, the South Korean girlband AOA performed in the ceremony. Vice Mayor of Hangzhou Wang Hong received the APC flag as the host of the next Games.

Medal table 

The 2018 Asian Para Games had 506 events, resulted in 506 medal sets being distributed. One additional gold medal was awarded as there was a first-place tie in Swimming men's S7 100 m backstroke event. As a consequence, no silver medal was awarded in that event. One additional silver medal was awarded as there was a second-place tie in Athletics men's T45/46/47 high jump event. As a consequence, no bronze medal was awarded in that event.

Two bronze medals were awarded in most events in racket sports (18 in Badminton, 23 in Table tennis and 12 in Wheelchair fencing) and one martial art (15 in Judo). Furthermore, there was a third-place tie in the Bowling mixed singles TPB10 event, giving a total of 69 additional bronze medals.

On the other hand, 7 silvers and 37 bronze medals were not awarded in 37 events in 7 sports due to lack of participants: 2 bronze each in Archery and chess, 1 silver and 4 bronze in cycling, 4 bronze in lawn bowls, 6 silver and 18 bronzes in athletics, 1 bronze in swimming and 6 bronzes in table tennis. A silver medal was not awarded in judo due to the disqualification of a judoka in the finals. Some medals in athletics and judo were reallocated due to doping violation.

As a result, a total of 1,541 medals comprising 507 gold medals, 497 silver medals and 537 bronze medals were awarded to athletes.

Official changes by country
In accordance with the APC Anti-Doping Rules, expired the result of Mirzaev Nurbek in Judo Men’s 81 kg event and Abdullaeva Kamolakhon in Women’s Long Jump T45/46/47. South Korea secures gold in judo after Chinese judoka’s disqualification in Judo Women’s +70 kg  event.

The official result of Men’s 81 kg was revised as follows:

Gold: Lee Jungmin (KOR)

Bronze: Jafari Seyed Omid (IRI)

Bronze: Kitazono Aramitsu (JPN)

The official result of the Women’s Long Jump T45/46/47 was revised as follows:

Gold: Lallwala Palliyagurunnans Amara Indumathi Karunathi (SRI)

Silver: Bornaki Zahra (IRI)

Bronze: Dissanayaka Mudiyanselage Kumudu Priyanka (SRI)

NPCs without medal

Podium Sweeps

Concerns and controversies

Like in the Asian Games, Jakarta was struggling to solve traffic congestion and air pollution problems.
On 8 October 2018, Indonesian judoka Miftahul Jannah was not allowed to compete, after she refused to take off her hijab, a head cover which is prohibited from being worn during competition according to one of International Judo Federation rules which states that the head of the judoka shall not be covered except for bandaging of a medical nature. President of the Indonesian National Paralympic Committee Senny Marbun said the incident occurred because of the committee's negligence and the judo coach appointed by the committee was unaware of the rule and confused over it because of poor English.
 On 9 October 2018, Iran beat Iraq in the men's goalball group B match after the referee awarded Iran five penalties. The Iraqi team led 6-5 at half time in the Pool B match, but eventually fell to a 14-9 defeat. Iraqi coach Yosefian Mahmod blamed the referee for the loss saying the referee's decision disadvantaged the team.

See also 

 2018 Asian Games
 2018 Winter Paralympics

Notes

References

External links
  (archived)
 Jakarta 2018 at Asian Paralympic Committee

 
Asian Para Games
2018 in Asian sport
2018 in Indonesian sport
Asian Para Games
Sport in Jakarta
2010s in Jakarta
Multi-sport events in Indonesia
International sports competitions hosted by Indonesia
Asian Para Games